Suneet Chopra is an Indian communist politician and trade unionist. He was the All India Joint Secretary of the All India Agricultural Workers Union. He was a Central Committee member of the Communist Party of India (Marxist).

Earlier he was in the Central Committee of the Students Federation of India and a founder member of the SFI in Jawaharlal Nehru University New Delhi, Later in 1980 he was the founder All India treasurer of the Democratic Youth Federation of India and became the Vice-President in 1984. Chopra was born on 24 December 1941 in Lahore. He is also an art critic, writer and poet. He is an alumnus of Modern School and St. Columba's School, Delhi, and St. Xavier's College, Calcutta. He taught science at Holland Park School. He read African studies at the School of Oriental and African Studies, University of London and later regional development at Jawaharlal Nehru University in New Delhi.He supports communism in India.

References

Communist Party of India (Marxist) politicians from West Bengal
Trade unionists from West Bengal
Living people
1941 births
University of Calcutta alumni
St. Columba's School, Delhi alumni
Alumni of SOAS University of London
Indian trade unionists